Communauté d'agglomération du Pays de Saint-Gilles-Croix-de-Vie is the communauté d'agglomération, an intercommunal structure, centred on the town of Saint-Gilles-Croix-de-Vie. It is located in the Vendée department, in the Pays de la Loire region, western France. Created in 2010, its seat is in Givrand. Its area is 292.2 km2. Its population was 50,311 in 2019.

Composition
The communauté d'agglomération consists of the following 14 communes:

L'Aiguillon-sur-Vie
Brem-sur-Mer
Bretignolles-sur-Mer
La Chaize-Giraud
Coëx
Commequiers
Le Fenouiller
Givrand
Landevieille
Notre-Dame-de-Riez
Saint-Gilles-Croix-de-Vie
Saint-Hilaire-de-Riez
Saint-Maixent-sur-Vie
Saint-Révérend

References

Saint-Gilles-Croix-de-Vie
Saint-Gilles-Croix-de-Vie